Jesper Bie was a former Danish badminton player. He was the Danish youth champion in 1938, the year that he finished runner up behind Ralph Nichols in the 1938 All England Badminton Championships. This opened up the floodgates of Danish stars that would then grace the Championships and dominate badminton for the next two decades.

Medal Record at the All England Badminton Championships

References

Danish male badminton players
Year of birth missing
Year of death missing